This is a list of members of the 20th and current Bundestag, the federal parliament of Germany. The 20th Bundestag was elected in the 26 September 2021 federal election, and was constituted in its first session on 26 October 2021.

The 20th Bundestag is the largest in history with 736 members, 138 seats larger than its minimum size of 598. Originally, it comprised 206 members of the Social Democratic Party of Germany (SPD), 197 members of the CDU/CSU, 118 members of Alliance 90/The Greens (GRÜNE), 92 members of the Free Democratic Party (FDP), 83 members of the Alternative for Germany (AfD), and 39 members of The Left (LINKE), as well as one member of the South Schleswig Voters' Association, who sits as a non-attached member. Matthias Helferich, who was elected for the AfD, withdrew from its parliamentary faction before the first session of the Bundestag. Deputies Johannes Huber and Uwe Witt also left in December. As a result, the AfD group consists of 80 members.

The President of the Bundestag is Bärbel Bas (SPD).

Presidium

Parliamentary groups

List of current members

List of former members

See also

 Politics of Germany
 List of Bundestag Members

Notes

References

20
Germany
Germany
Politics of Germany
Bundestag